"A Porter’s Love Song to a Chambermaid" is a jazz standard song with music by James P. Johnson  and lyrics by Andy Razaf  first published in 1930.  It was composed for the musical "The Kitchen Mechanics Revue” “a critique of political economy you can dance to.”  a “plotless but tightly themed musical celebrating male and female service workers as Harlem’s fountain of wealth, sanity, pleasure and art,”

The song has been recorded many times over the years, Roy Milton and His Solid Senders recorded a R&B version in 1947.

Discography
Andy Razaf with Jimmy Johnson and His Orchestra, 3/25/31, Columbia, 14668-D
 Fats Waller and his Rhythm, May 16, 1934

References

1930 songs
Songs written by Andy Razaf
Songs with music by James P. Johnson
1930s jazz standards
Columbia Records singles